Kiełpinek is a non-operational PKP railway station in Kiełpinek (Pomeranian Voivodeship), Poland.

Lines crossing the station

References 
Kiełpinek article at Polish stations database, URL accessed at 17 March 2006

Railway stations in Gdańsk
Disused railway stations in Pomeranian Voivodeship